Karaq-e Shah Jahan (also Romanized as Karaq Shāh Jān; also known as Karakh Shāh Jān) is a village in Qorqori Rural District, Qorqori District, Hirmand County, Sistan and Baluchestan Province, Iran. At the 2006 census, its population was 111, in 30 families.

References 

Populated places in Hirmand County